Govor tela (English: Body Language) is the debut studio album by Serbian recording artist Milica Pavlović. It was released 28 June 2014 through Grand Production. After finishing 8th in the televised singing contest Zvezde Granda in 2012, Pavlović was signed to the Grand record label and released her debut single, titled "Tango", in June.

The album also features three more previously released singles – "Pakleni plan", "Sexy Señorita" and "Alibi".

Track listing

Release history

References

External links
Govor tela on Discogs
Govor tela on iTunes

2014 debut albums
Grand Production albums
Milica Pavlović albums
Serbian-language albums